The 1988 Constituent Assembly, also known as the National Constituent Assembly was a constituent assembly held in Brasília to establish Brazil's new democratic Constitution after 21 years under military rule. In November 1986, general elections were held to elect the members of the Constituent Assembly, which took office on February 1, 1987. Ulysses Guimarães, from the Brazilian Democratic Movement Party (Partido do Movimento Democrático Brasileiro - PMDB) of São Paulo, served as president of the Assembly.

The majority in the Constituent Assembly was formed by the Democratic Centre (PMDB, PFL, PTB, PDS, and smaller parties), also known as "Big Centre" (Centrão). They were supported by the executive branch and represented conservative factions of the society, and had a decisive influence in the work of the Constituent and the outcome of important decisions, such as the duration of then President Sarney's term, the maintenance of the agrarian policy and the role of the Armed Forces.

External links

 Constituicao de 1988 on Brasil Escola.

Constitution of Brazil
Defunct unicameral legislatures
Constituent assemblies
1988 in Brazil